Old Quaker Cemetery, founded in 1759, is a cemetery located in Camden, South Carolina, in Kershaw County. It dates back to the earliest days of Camden, which was first settled in 1730, and is the oldest inland city in South Carolina. The cemetery is notable in that it maintains the gravesites of numerous famous people, to include three Civil War Confederate Army generals, two Medal of Honor recipients, and one South Carolina Governor.

Notable gravesites
 Joseph Brevard (1766–1821) – Revolutionary War figure, US Representative, and Supreme Court jurist
 Richmond Hobson Hilton (1898–1933) – World War I Medal of Honor recipient
 John Doby Kennedy (1840–1896) – Confederate Army general, and later Lieutenant Governor
 Joseph Brevard Kershaw (1822–1894) – Confederate Army general, president of the State Senate, and for whose forebearers Kershaw County was named
 Richard Rowland Kirkland (1843–1863) – Civil War Confederate soldier and hero at the Battle of Fredericksburg
 John Peter Richardson III (1829–1899) –  Governor
 Donald Leroy Truesdell (1906–1993) – Medal of Honor for action in the Occupation of Nicaragua (cenotaph)
 John Bordenave Villepigue (1830–1862) – Confederate Civil War general, and ancestor to John Canty Villepigue
 John Canty Villepigue (1896–1943) – World War I Medal of Honor recipient

References

External links
 
 

History of South Carolina
Quaker cemeteries
1730 establishments in South Carolina
Cemeteries in South Carolina